

This is a list of the Indiana state historical markers in Miami County.

This is intended to be a complete list of the official state historical markers placed in Miami County, Indiana, United States by the Indiana Historical Bureau. The locations of the historical markers and their latitude and longitude coordinates are included below when available, along with their names, years of placement, and topics as recorded by the Historical Bureau.  There are 2 historical markers located in Miami County.

Historical markers

See also
List of Indiana state historical markers
National Register of Historic Places listings in Miami County, Indiana

References

External links
Indiana Historical Marker Program
Indiana Historical Bureau

Miami County
Historical markers